Zuill is both a given name and a surname. Notable people with the name include:

Zuill Bailey (born 1972), American cellist
Aljame Zuill (born 1976), Bermudian footballer
Bill Zuill (1901–1960), New Zealand footballer
Dennis Zuill (born 1978), Bermudian footballer
Morison Zuill (born 1937), Scottish cricketer
William Zuill (1867–1942), Australian politician